In music, perpetuum mobile (English pronunciation /pərˌpɛtjʊəm ˈmoʊbɪleɪ/, /ˈmoʊbɪli/; literally, "perpetual motion"), moto perpetuo (Italian), mouvement perpétuel (French), movimento perpétuo (Portuguese) movimiento perpetuo (Spanish), carries two distinct meanings: first, as describing entire musical compositions or passages within them that are characterised by a continuous stream of notes, usually but not always at a rapid tempo; and also as describing entire compositions, or extended passages within them that are meant to be played in a repetitious fashion, often an indefinite number of times.

Types of perpetuum mobile composition

As a distinct composition, perpetuum mobile can be defined as one in which part or most of the piece is intended to be repeated an often unspecified number of times, without the "motion" of the melody being halted when a repeat begins.

Canons are often intended to be performed in a moto perpetuo fashion, and can thus be called canon perpetuus.

In some cases the repeats of a "perpetuum mobile" piece are at a different pitch,  a modulation or a chord progression occurs during the repeatable part. Some of the riddle canons of Bach's  are examples of this particular kind of perpetuum mobile/canon perpetuus.

Perpetuum mobile as a genre of separate musical compositions was at the height of its popularity by the end of the 19th century. Such pieces would often be performed as virtuoso encores, in some cases increasing the tempo along the repeats.

Examples
Perpetuum mobile pieces of both kinds include:

Baroque period
 The Preludio from Bach's Partita for Violin No. 3 consists almost entirely of sixteenth notes.

Classical period
 The finale of Haydn's String Quartet No. 53 in D major ("The Lark"), Op. 64, No. 5
 The finale of Beethoven's 22nd piano sonata, and large segments of the finales of his Tempest and Appassionata sonatas (although these are not very fast; the Tempest and the 22nd sonata are only marked Allegretto, and the Appassionata is marked Allegro ma non troppo)
 The second of Franz Schubert's Impromptus, D. 899
 The fourth of Franz Schubert's moments musicaux (likewise not very fast, marked Moderato)

Romantic period

 The finale of Carl Maria von Weber's Piano Sonata No. 1
 Charles-Valentin Alkan's Le chemin de fer, op. 27, for piano
 Felix Mendelssohn's Perpetuum mobile, op. 119, for piano
 Ottokar Novacek's Perpetuum Mobile, for violin and piano
 Nicolò Paganini's Moto perpetuo Op. 11 (No. 6) for violin
 Nikolai Rimsky-Korsakov's Flight of the Bumblebee, an interlude for his opera The Tale of Tsar Saltan
 Johann Strauss II's Perpetuum Mobile: musikalischer Scherz for orchestra
 Robert Schumann's Hasche-Mann from Kinderszenen
 Bedřich Smetana's Album Leaf No.3 from Six Album Leaves Op. 2
 Tchaikovsky's Piano Concerto No. 1, third movement
 Tchaikovsky's Symphony No. 6, third movement

20th century
 Mouvement (from Images, Set 1), a 1905 piano composition by Claude Debussy
 Perpetuum Mobile (from Die allerersten Vortragsstueckchen des jungen Cellisten Op.19) by Hugo Schlemüller (1912)
 The second movement of Prokofiev's Piano Concerto No. 2 (1912–1913)
 Trois Mouvements perpétuels, a 1918 piano composition by Francis Poulenc
 The end of the opera Wozzeck, Act III Scene 5, by Alban Berg (1914–1924)
 The last movement of Maurice Ravel's Violin Sonata No. 2 (1923–1927)
 The organ solo (movement 7) from Janáček's Glagolitic Mass (1926)
 The last movement of the Violin Concerto by Samuel Barber (1939)
 The last movement of Béla Bartók's Concerto for Orchestra(1943)
 Prelude no. 2 in A minor from 24 Preludes and Fugues by Dmitri Shostakovich (1950–1951). Also the third movement of his Symphony No. 8 in C minor
 The final movement of Benjamin Britten's Cello Sonata in C Major Op. 65 (1960). Also the third movement of his Suite for Violin and Piano Op. 6 (1935), the finale of his first solo cello suite (1964) and the penultimate movement of his third cello suite (1972)
 Arvo Pärt's orchestral Perpetuum mobile (1963)
 "Perpetuum Mobile" by Michael Roberts, used as the startup music for Thames Television and earlier ABC Weekend TV 
 "Perpetuum Mobile for pedals alone" a showpiece for Organ by Wilhelm Middelschulte
 "Fracture", a moto perpetuo piece based on the whole-tone scale composed by guitarist Robert Fripp and included on the 1974 album Starless and Bible Black
 "Canto Ostinato" by Simeon ten Holt (1976)
 John Adams's Short Ride in a Fast Machine (1986)
 "Perpetuum Mobile" by Penguin Cafe Orchestra (1987)
 "Velocities (Moto Perpetuo)" for solo marimba by Joseph Schwantner (1990)

21st century
 "Equus" by Eric Whitacre (2000)
 The album Perpetuum Mobile by the German avant garde group Einstürzende Neubauten has some examples of the concept
 Neil Peart's drum solo "Moto perpetuo" on Rush's 2011 album Time Machine 2011: Live in Cleveland
 "Nonstop" by Juan María Solare, piano solo invention in the time signature  5/8 (2020).

References
Notes

References

Musical techniques
Musical terminology
Music genres